The Southern Carpathians  (also known as the Transylvanian Alps;) are a group of mountain ranges located in southern Romania. They cover the part of the Carpathian Mountains located between the Prahova River in the east and the Timiș and Cerna Rivers in the west. To the south they are bounded by the Balkan mountain range in eastern Serbia.

Heights

The Southern Carpathians are the second highest group of mountains in the Carpathian Mountain range (after Tatra), reaching heights of over 2,500 meters. Although considerably smaller than the Alps, they are classified as having an alpine landscape. Their high mountain character, combined with great accessibility, makes them popular with tourists and scientists.

The highest peaks are:
 Moldoveanu Peak, 2,544 metres – Făgăraș Mountains
 Negoiu, 2,535 metres – Făgăraș Mountains
 Parângu Mare, 2,519 metres – Parâng Mountains
 Omu Peak 2,514 metres – Bucegi Mountains
 Peleaga, 2,509 metres – Retezat Mountains

Despite the heights, some of the most accessible passages in the Carpathians in Romania are along the rivers, which cross the mountain range (the Olt River) or form wide valleys (along the Prahova River Valley or along the Jiu River Valley).

Geology
The South Carpathians represent an intricate pile of tectonic nappes, overthrusted from west eastwards during the Austrian (Middle Cretaceous) and Laramian paroxysmal phases, corresponding to various plate fragments. The napes are (from west eastwards): the Supragetic, Getic, Severin and Danubian Units. The Getic Nappe was identified by Murgoci (1905), while the general understanding over the Alpine structure of the South Carpathians was later refined by Codarcea (1940), Codarcea et al. (1961), Năstăseanu et al. (1981), Săndulescu (1984), Săndulescu and Dimitrescu (2004), and Mutihac (1990). The first to apply the global tectonics concepts for the Romanian Carpathians were Rădulescu and Săndulescu (1973).

The Supragetic, Getic Nappes as well as the Danubian Units represent units with both a metamorphic basement and a sedimentary cover, while the Severin Nappe includes only a sedimentary sequence. The Getic Nappe and the Danubian Units sediments include a Palaeozoic sequence (Upper Carboniferous, Lower Permian) and a Mesozoic sequence (Lowermost Jurassic – Middle Cretaceous). The Supragetic Nappe comprises mainly metamorphosed rocks (gneisses, micashists), while the Severin Nappe includes only Upper Jurassic – Lower Cretaceous sediments.

Mountain ranges

From east to west, four mountain groups can be identified, separated by different river valleys.
Bucegi Mountains group – between the Prahova and Dâmbovița Rivers.
Bucegi Mountains (Munții Bucegi)
Piatra Craiului (literally: "Rock of the King")
Leaotă Mountains (Munții Leaotă)
Făgăraș Mountains group – between the Dâmbovița River and the Olt River.
Făgăraș Mountains (Munții Făgărașului)
Iezer Mountains (Munții Iezer; literally: "Mountains of the Deep Lake")
Cozia Mountains (Munții Cozia)
Parâng Mountains group – between the Olt River and the Jiu River.
Parâng Mountains (Munții Parâng)
Șureanu Mountains (Munții Șureanu/M. Sebeșului)
Cindrel Mountains (Munții Cindrel/M. Cibinului)
Lotru Mountains (Munții Lotrului; literally: "Mountains of the Thief")
Căpățână Mountains (Munții Căpățânii; literally: "Mountains of the Skull")
Retezat-Godeanu Mountains group – between the Jiu River and the Timiș and Cerna Rivers.
Retezat Mountains (Munții Retezat; literally: "Hewed Mountains")
Godeanu Mountains (Munții Godeanu)
Vâlcan Mountains (Munții Vâlcan)
Mehedinți Mountains (Munții Mehendinți)
Cerna Mountains (Munții Cernei)
Țarcu Mountains (Munții Țarcu; literally: "Pen Mountains").
Poiana Ruscă Mountains

The first two groups are steepest on the North side, and the last two are steepest on the South side.

Gallery

See also
 Romanian Carpathians
 Divisions of the Carpathians
 Iron Gates, at the South-Western end
 Prahova Valley, at the Eastern end

References

External links

 Pictures and landscapes from the Southern Carpathians

 
.
.
Mountain ranges of the Carpathians
Geography of Southeastern Europe
Geography of Transylvania